Arslanovo (Arıślan) is a rural locality (a selo) and the administrative centre of Arslanovsky Selsoviet, Kiginsky District, Bashkortostan, Russia. The population was 719 as of 2010. There are 6 streets.

Geography 
Arslanovo is located 36 km southeast of Verkhniye Kigi (the district's administrative centre) by road. Asylguzhino is the nearest rural locality.

References 

Rural localities in Kiginsky District